Montreal Lake 106B is an Indian reserve of the Montreal Lake Cree Nation in Saskatchewan. In the 2016 Canadian Census, it recorded a population of 442 living in 113 of its 118 total private dwellings. In the same year, its Community Well-Being index was calculated at 47 of 100, compared to 58.4 for the average First Nations community and 77.5 for the average non-Indigenous community.

References

Indian reserves in Saskatchewan
Division No. 15, Saskatchewan
Montreal Lake Cree Nation